Drymaria monticola is a herb restricted to Santa Cruz in the Galapagos, where it is commonly found in the highlands. There is one doubtful record on Santiago in 1991.

The plant is native to Ecuador and occurs in the humid zone. It is supposed to be threatened by invasions of Cinchona, Rubus and Melinis.

References

Caryophyllaceae
Endemic flora of Galápagos